Edward Malcolm Korry (January 7, 1922 – January 29, 2003) was an American diplomat during the administrations of Presidents Kennedy, Johnson, and Nixon.

Korry, a native of New York, was U.S. Ambassador to Ethiopia (1963-1967) and to Chile (1967–1971). During the Allende administration, the U.S. under Nixon implemented a tougher economic policy toward Chile, decreased economic aid, and prevented access to loans. The US support for the opposition culminated in the September 11th, 1973 coup that overthrew Allende, and resulted in the dictatorship of Augusto Pinochet.

Prior to his appointment to Ethiopia by John F. Kennedy, Korry was European editor for Look magazine and a United Press correspondent in post-World War II Europe. In 1972 and 1973, he was president of the Association of American Publishers, and later, he was president of the United Nations Association of the United States of America. Korry was also a founding director of the Committee for East-West Relations and a member of the Council on Foreign Relations.

Korry was greatly embittered by widespread press reports, many of them by journalists who had been his peers and friends during his reportorial career, to the effect that he had played an instrumental role in a military coup to depose and kill Allende, despite Korry's repeated public claims that he had known nothing of the CIA's plans to foment this, nor had he played any role in it. In 1981, The New York Times, in what Time magazine called a "2,300-word correction," wrote that although the CIA had attempted to orchestrate a military takeover in Chile, "none of this, it is now evident, was known to Ambassador Korry".  This "correction" occurred while Korry was teaching a course on International Relations at Connecticut College in New London, CT.

Korry died from cancer on January 29, 2003 in Charlotte, North Carolina.

References

External links
 

1922 births
2003 deaths
Ambassadors of the United States to Chile
Ambassadors of the United States to Ethiopia
People from New York City
American male journalists